Big Springs Elementary School District is a public school district based in Siskiyou County, California, United States. It operates Big Springs Elementary School in Montague, California, with an enrollment of 112 students in the 2006–2007 school year.

References

External links
 
 

School districts in Siskiyou County, California